Marclay is a surname. Notable people with the surname include:

Christian Marclay (born 1955), Swiss-American artist
Sergio Marclay (born 1982), Argentine footballer